Kahnuj-e Bozorg (also Romanized as Kahnūj-e Bozorg; also known as Kahnūj and Kahnūj-e Aḩmadkhānī) is a village in Ahmadi Rural District, Ahmadi District, Hajjiabad County, Hormozgan Province, Iran. At the 2006 census, its population was 69, in 18 families.

References 

Populated places in Hajjiabad County